Box Springs might refer to:

Locations

Canada
Box Springs Road, an exit on Alberta Highway 1 in Canada

United States
Box Springs, Arkansas
Box Springs, California
Box Springs, Georgia
Box Springs Mountain, a mountain in Southern California
Box Springs Mountains, a mountain range named after Box Springs Mountain
Box Springs Reserve, part of the University of California Natural Reserve System
Box Springs Elementary School, in the Moreno Valley Unified School District
Box Springs Canyon, site of a 1906 auto race won by Leigh Lynch

See also
Box Spring, Yellowstone Park
Box-spring, a type of bed base